The 1st Photographic Group is an inactive United States Army Air Forces unit. It was organized in the spring of 1941, and was the Army Air Force's only non combat mapping unit until December 1943, when a second group was formed.  From early 1944 it was assigned to the 311th Photographic Wing. It was disbanded on 5 October 1944, and its personnel and equipment absorbed by the 311th Wing, but it was reconstituted in 1985 as the 358th Special Operations Group.  It has not been active since.

History
The 1st Photographic Group was organized at Bolling Field in June 1941, drawing its cadre from the 1st Photographic Squadron as GHQ Air Force expanded its capability for photographic mapping and to conduct experiments in long range photographic reconnaissance, drawing from the experience of the Royal Air Force, which was involved in combat operations.  In addition to the 1st at Bolling, its original components included the newly-activated 2nd Photographic Squadron at Gray Field, Washington, 3rd Photographic Squadron at Maxwell Field, Alabama and 4th Photographic Squadron at Moffett Field, California.  Operational control of the four squadrons was given to the four continental numbered air forces.

Prior to April 1942, Army Air Forces (AAF) bombardment groups had attached or assigned reconnaissance squadrons, although these squadrons actually received more training on their secondary bombing mission than what was (on paper) their primary mission.  In April, the AAF recognized this arrangement by redesignating these units as bombardment squadrons and transferring the mission to the group and photographic reconnaissance units that were later organized. Following the attack on Pearl Harbor, the group assisted observation groups in training reconnaissance units, although its participation was limited because each of its squadrons was busily engaged in carrying out mapping missions for hemisphere defense.  

During the Second World War, the group charted and mapped areas of the United States and sent detachments to perform similar functions in Alaska, Canada, Africa (including Operation Rusty), the Middle East, India, the Caribbean, Mexico, Central and South America, and the Kurils. 

In December 1943, the AAF activated a second mapping group in the United States, the 11th Photographic Group, at Reading Army Air Field, Pennsylvania.  The 1st, 3rd, and 19th Photographic Charting Squadrons were transferred to the new group.

In February 1944, the AAF organized the 311th Photographic Wing, and assigned both the 1st and 11th Groups to it.  On 5 October 1944, both groups were disbanded and their components assigned directly to the wing.  The group was transferred in inactive status to the newly created United States Air Force in 1947. It was reconstituted on 31 July 1985 as a special operations unit, but was not activated.

Lineage
 Constituted as the 1st Photographic Group on 15 May 1941
 Activated on 10 June 1941
 Redesignated 1st Mapping Group 13 January 1942
 Redesignated 1st Photographic Charting Group c. 11 August 1943
 Disbanded on 5 October 1944
 Reconstituted on 31 July 1985 and redesignated 358th Special Operations Group

Assignments
 General Headquarters Air Force (later Air Force Combat Command), 10 June 1941
 Second Air Force, 13 October 1942
 311th Photographic Wing, 5 March – 5 October 1944

Squadrons
 1st Photographic Squadron (later 1st Mapping Squadron, 1st Photographic Mapping Squadron, 1st Photographic Charting Squadron): 10 June 1941 – 1 December 1943
 2d Photographic Squadron (later 2d Mapping Squadron, 2d Photographic Mapping Squadron, 2d Photographic Charting Squadron): 10 June 1941 – 5 October 1944
 3d Photographic Squadron (later 3d Mapping Squadron, 3d Photographic Mapping Squadron, 3d Photographic Charting Squadron): 10 June 1941 – 1 December 1943
 4th Photographic Squadron (later 4th Mapping Squadron, 4th Photographic Mapping Squadron, 4th Photographic Charting Squadron): 10 Jun 1941 – 5 Oct 1944
 6th Photographic Squadron: 13 November 1943 – 5 October 1944
 19th Photographic Charting Squadron: assigned 11 August 1943, attached 19 November – 1 December 1943
 91st Photographic Mapping Squadron: 9 October 1943 – 5 October 1944<

Stations
 Bolling Field, District of Columbia, 10 June 1941
 Peterson Field, Colorado, 23 December 1943
 Buckley Field, Colorado, 2 July – 5 October 1944

Aircraft

 Douglas A-20 Havoc
 Lockheed A-29 Hudson
 Douglas B-18 Bolo
 Boeing B-17 Flying Fortress
 Consolidated B-24 Liberator
 Beechcraft F-2 Expeditor
 Douglas F-3 Havoc
 Consolidated F-7 Liberator
 North American B-25 Mitchell
 North American F-10 Mitchell

Notes

Notes
 Explanatory notes

 Citations

References 

 
 
 

Reconnaissance groups of the United States Army Air Forces
Military units and formations established in 1941
Military units and formations disestablished in 1944